Anthony Gilbert may refer to:

Anthony Gilbert (author) (1899–1973), English crime writer
Anthony Gilbert (composer) (born 1934), British composer
Anthony Gilbert (MP) (–1555), English politician

See also
Tony Gilbert (Antonio Gilbert, born 1979), American football player